Black Rock Gorge is a deep and narrow cleft in Old Red Sandstone conglomerate through which the Allt Graad (also known as the 'River Glass') flows in Easter Ross, Scotland. It was caused by rapids heavily burdened with sediment being carried upwards as part of the great Post-glacial rebound.

It lies a few kilometres from Evanton, at the edge of the Evanton Wood in the traditional territory of the Clan Munro. The Black Rock Gorge is approximately 1.5 km in length as shown on 1:50 000 Ordnance Survey mapping  and reaches 36 metres (120 feet) in depth. It attracts a substantial amount of tourism, and there is a camping site nearby.

The gorge is the subject of local Gaelic myth, in which a local noblewoman, the Lady of Balconie, is lured into its depths by a mysterious man, thought to be the Devil. Ever since, it is said, the cries which she utters can be heard from the top.

In April 2004, ten days of filming took place in the area for the movie Harry Potter and the Goblet of Fire and the gorge is the setting for one scene.
Also James Robertson's 2006 novel The Testament of Gideon Mack is inspired by Black Rock Gorge.

References

Sources
 Omand, Donald (ed.), The Ross and Cromarty Book, (Golspie, 1984)

External links
Illustration of Black Rock Gorge 

Geology of Scotland
Ross and Cromarty
Canyons and gorges of Scotland
Scottish mythology
Landforms of Highland (council area)